In mathematics and physics, multiple-scale analysis (also called the method of multiple scales) comprises techniques used to construct uniformly valid approximations to the solutions of perturbation problems, both for small as well as large values of the independent variables. This is done by introducing fast-scale and slow-scale variables for an independent variable, and subsequently treating these variables, fast and slow, as if they are independent. In the solution process of the perturbation problem thereafter, the resulting additional freedom – introduced by the new independent variables – is used to remove (unwanted) secular terms. The latter puts constraints on the approximate solution, which are called solvability conditions.

Mathematics research from about the 1980s proposes that coordinate transforms and invariant manifolds provide a sounder support for multiscale modelling (for example, see center manifold and slow manifold).

Example: undamped Duffing equation

Differential equation and energy conservation
As an example for the method of multiple-scale analysis, consider the undamped and unforced Duffing equation:
 
which is a second-order ordinary differential equation describing a nonlinear oscillator. A solution y(t) is sought for small values of the (positive) nonlinearity parameter 0 < ε ≪ 1. The undamped Duffing equation is known to be a Hamiltonian system:

with q = y(t) and p = dy/dt. Consequently, the Hamiltonian H(p, q) is a conserved quantity, a constant, equal to H = ½ + ¼ ε for the given initial conditions. This implies that both y and dy/dt have to be bounded:

Straightforward perturbation-series solution
A regular perturbation-series approach to the problem proceeds by writing  and substituting this into the undamped Duffing equation. Matching powers of  gives the system of equations

Solving these subject to the initial conditions yields

Note that the last term between the square braces is secular: it grows without bound for large |t|. In particular, for  this term is O(1) and has the same order of magnitude as the leading-order term. Because the terms have become disordered, the series is no longer an asymptotic expansion of the solution.

Method of multiple scales
To construct a solution that is valid beyond , the method of multiple-scale analysis is used. Introduce the slow scale t1:

and assume the solution y(t) is a perturbation-series solution dependent both on t and t1, treated as:

So:

using dt1/dt = ε. Similarly:

Then the zeroth- and first-order problems of the multiple-scales perturbation series for the Duffing equation become:

Solution
The zeroth-order problem has the general solution:

with A(t1) a complex-valued amplitude to the zeroth-order solution Y0(t, t1) and i2 = −1.  Now, in the first-order problem the forcing in the right hand side of the differential equation is

where c.c. denotes the complex conjugate of the preceding terms. The occurrence of secular terms can be prevented by imposing on the – yet unknown – amplitude A(t1) the solvability condition

As a result, the approximate solution by the multiple-scales analysis is

This agrees with the nonlinear frequency changes found by employing the Lindstedt–Poincaré method.

This new solution is valid until . Higher-order solutions – using the method of multiple scales – require the introduction of additional slow scales, i.e., etc.  However, this introduces possible ambiguities in the perturbation series solution, which require a careful treatment (see).

Coordinate transform to amplitude/phase variables

Alternatively, modern approaches derive these sorts of models using coordinate transforms, like in the method of normal forms,  as described next.

A solution  is sought in new coordinates  where the amplitude  varies slowly and the phase  varies at an almost constant rate, namely  Straightforward algebra finds the coordinate transform

transforms Duffing's equation into the pair that the radius is constant  and the phase evolves according to

That is, Duffing's oscillations are of constant amplitude  but have different frequencies  depending upon the amplitude.

More difficult examples are better treated using a time-dependent coordinate transform involving complex exponentials (as also invoked in the previous multiple time-scale approach).  A web service will perform the analysis for a wide range of examples.

See also
 Method of matched asymptotic expansions
 WKB approximation
Method of averaging
Krylov–Bogoliubov averaging method

Notes

References

External links

Mathematical physics
Asymptotic analysis
Perturbation theory